The Sperwill 120 is a British paramotor that was designed by Riann Oliver and produced by Sperwill Ltd of Bristol for powered paragliding. Now out of production, when it was available the aircraft was supplied complete and ready-to-fly.

Design and development
The aircraft was designed to comply with the US FAR 103 Ultralight Vehicles rules as well as European regulations. It features a paraglider-style wing, single-place accommodation and a single  Radne Raket 120 engine in pusher configuration with a 3.42:1 ratio reduction drive and a three-bladed, fixed-pitch wooden propeller. The aircraft is built from a combination of bolted aluminium and 4130 steel tubing and dismantles for ground transport.

As is the case with all paramotors, take-off and landing is accomplished by foot. Inflight steering is accomplished via handles that actuate the canopy brakes, creating roll and yaw.

Specifications (120)

References

120
2000s British ultralight aircraft
Single-engined pusher aircraft
Paramotors